Pa Faek is the name of several subdistricts in Thailand:

Pa Faek, Bueng Kan
Pa Faek, Phayao